Maroufi is a surname. People with the surname include:

People
 Abbas Maroufi (1957–2022), Iranian novelist and journalist
 Ibrahim Maaroufi (born 1989), Moroccan football player
 Javad Maroufi (1912–1993), Iranian musical artist

Fictional characters
 Reza Maroufi, main character in the Iranian film The Command (2005 film)

Surnames of Iranian origin